Pass the Flask is the first studio album released by American post-hardcore band the Bled.

Reissue
The Bled originally released their first album on Fiddler Records, an independent, now defunct record label. Pass the Flask sold approx 50,000 copies while on Fiddler. The Bled then signed to Vagrant Records to release their second album, Found in the Flood. They reissued the first album on their new label Vagrant Records, containing all of the songs from Pass the Flask, as well as the almost impossible to find His First Crush and The Bled EPs and officially unreleased tracks that only family and friends had. Jeremy Talley, the guitarist, said that "it seemed like the right time to put them all on one disc and put it out there before too many people find out about the Internet." In the thanks section of the booklet, they say that they are "buying a Hummer" with the money from selling the CD twice.

Track origins
The first ten songs make up the reissue, coming from Pass the Flask. Track 2 was originally entitled "Dale Earnhardt's Seatbelt", but was changed for legal reasons. It is still listed as "Dale Earnhardt's Seatbelt" in the liner notes. Tracks 11–15 are from His First Crush, 16–18 are from The Bled . Song 19, "Ok, But Here's How It Really Happened", has never been officially released before. Song 20, "Hotel Coral Essex" (original recording), is from a demo recorded for a 2004 Warped Tour sampler, although it was later added to and released on Found in the Flood. Finally, song 21, "Lay On My Cot", is said to have been "sent to us from deep space and shall never be spoken of again." The track "Ruth Buzzi Better Watch Her Back" is titled after a line of dialogue from the comedy Wet Hot American Summer. The track "Get Up You Son of a Bitch, Cause Mickey Loves Ya" is titled after a line of dialogue from Rocky.

Track listing
All songs written by the Bled.

Reissue bonus tracks

Credits
Original
Beau Burchell - Engineering, production, mixing
Ted Danson - Executive producer
Shawn Sullivan - Mastering
Ryan Joseph Shaughnessy - Photography
Mike Celi - Bass
Jeremy Talley - Guitar
James Muñoz - Vocals
Ross Ott - Guitar
Mike Pedicone - Drums

Reissue
 James Muñoz - Vocals
 Jeremy Talley - Guitar
 Ross Ott - Guitar
 Mike Pedicone - Drums
 Mike Celi - Bass
 Beau Burchell - Engineer
 Beau Burchell - Producer
 Beau Burchell - Mixer
 Ted Danson - Executive Producer
 RJ Shaughnessy - Photography
 Sergie - "Slapping The Art Together"
 Ben Goetting - Additional Layout
 Amy Fleisher, Rossmosis, and Friends - Additional Photography

References

2003 debut albums
The Bled albums
Fiddler Records albums
Vagrant Records albums
Albums produced by Beau Burchell